Diggins Township is a township in Webster County, in the U.S. state of Missouri.

Diggins Township takes its name from Mr. H.W. Diggins, a railroad official.

References

Townships in Missouri
Townships in Webster County, Missouri